Joe Cummings (born Joseph Robert Cummings, September 1, 1964 in Union, Ontario, Canada) is a Canadian poet.

His poetry has been published in Canadian and international publications including, Literary Review of Canada, Adirondack Review and Quills Canadian Poetry Magazine.

His first poetry collection, Threats and Gossip, was published by McArthur & Company Publishing in 2007.

References

21st-century Canadian poets
Living people
1964 births
Writers from Ontario
Canadian male poets
21st-century Canadian male writers